The Spence School is an American all-girls private school in New York City, founded in 1892 by Clara B. Spence.

Overview
Spence has about 740 students, with grades K-4 representing the Lower School, 5-8 representing the Middle School, and 9-12 representing the Upper School. Lower school average class sizes are 16-18 and middle and upper school average class sizes are 13-14. The student: teacher ratio is 7:1 and students of color in all grades make up approximately 33 percent of the student body.

For the 2017-18 academic year, tuition and fees total $49,980 for all grades. Its sister schools are the all-girls Brearley School, the all-girls Chapin School and the all-boys Collegiate School, all in New York City. Forbes magazine ranked Spence ninth on its "America's Best Prep Schools" list in 2010.

History
The Spence School was founded in 1892 by Clara B. Spence, who was its head for 31 years. The school's motto is "non scholae sed vitae discimus" (Latin for "Not for school, but for life we learn"). The first building was located on New York City's West 48th Street. The school once had a boarding option, but all current girls are day students.

Clara B. Spence described her school as: "A place not of mechanical instruction, but a school of character where the common requisites for all have been human feeling, a sense of humor and the spirit of intellectual and moral adventure."

The school has been located on East 91st Street since 1929.

Academics
Spence offers a liberal arts and science curriculum, including programs in the arts and foreign languages. In a Worth magazine study, out of the 31,700 private and public high schools in the United States, Spence ranked the sixth most successful school in the country in placing its graduates in Harvard, Yale and Princeton.

Athletics 

Softball

The Varsity Softball Team won the AAIS Tournament 2015, 2017, and 2018 and were regular season AAIS Champions in 2018.

Tennis

The Varsity Tennis team won the 2011 Athletic Association of Independent Schools of New York City (AAIS) Tournament Championship during the 2010-2011 school year, and went undefeated and won the 2012 AAIS League Championship during the 2011-2012 school year.

Volleyball

Spence captured the AAIS championship in 2013 and 2014, and finished as league runner-up in 2015, 2016 and 2017 and 2018. In 2013, Spence finished the season 21-0, capturing numerous titles: AAIS regular season champion, AAIS tournament champion and NYSAISAA champion. Spence also won the 2009 and 2010 NYSAISAA state championships, advanced to the state quarterfinal in 2011 and 2015, and advanced to the state semi-finals in 2012, 2014, 2016 and 2017.

Indoor Track

The Spence Indoor Track team earned the title AAIS Champions for five consecutive years in a row, from 2018 to 2023.

Outdoor Track

In 2019, the Sabers’ Varsity Track and Field Team won their fifth AAIS title in the last 6 years, scoring a league record of 210 points. In 2018, Spence finished 1-2-3 in the 100m, making league history. The Sabers finished 3rd at the 2019 NYSAISAA State Championship, earning gold in the 4x100m Relay and the 4x400m Relay, sending both teams and a freshman individual athlete in the shot put to represent Spence at the NY State Federation Track and Field Championship, where the 4x100m relay team set a new school record with a time of 50.23sec and finished 4th in Division II. The team also finished 4th at the 2018 NYSAISAA State Championships. In 2016, the team claimed second in the AAIS, 5th in the NYSAISAA, and put two individual medalists on the podium at the NY State Federation Track Championship. 2018 marked the seventh consecutive year the team has had multiple student-athletes qualify for the NY State Federation Track and Field Championship. At the 2015 NYSAISAA Federation State Championship, the 4x400m relay team set a school record, breaking the magical four-minute mark.

Squash

In 2018-19, the Spence squash team finished 20-1, en route to winning 4 titles;  AAIS Regular Season and Tournament Championship, the NYSAIS Coaches' Association Championship and the HEAD US Squash Division II High School Girls National Team Championship, capturing the first National Championship in school history.

Campus

The Spence School campus is currently located in three buildings in the Carnegie Hill Historic District on the Upper East Side of Manhattan. The Upper School (9–12) and Middle School (5–8) are housed a half block from Central Park/5th Avenue at 22 East 91st Street, next to the Cooper-Hewitt Museum. The Lower School (K–4) is housed in the renovated landmark building William Goadby Loew House on East 93rd Street between Park Avenue and Madison Avenue. On April 28, 2008, the Spence School announced the acquisition of a third building through the purchase of the Wanamaker Munn townhouse at 17 East 90th Street, directly behind the Upper and Middle School facility. The new townhouse is connected to the main 91st Street building. On September 16, 2011, the Spence School announced the purchase of a fourth building, the Spence School athletic and educational facility—Spence 412—at 412 East 90th Street. It is currently under construction and slated for opening in fall 2020. The facility features a regulation-size gymnasium for volleyball and basketball; nine squash courts, including an exhibition court; a multipurpose room for the performing arts; as well an ecology center.

Notable alumnae

 Serena Altschul, broadcast journalist
 Madeleine Astor, Titanic survivor
 Maiken Baird, Academy Award-winning film producer
 Frances Baldwin, artist
 Edith Bouvier Beale, socialite
 Georgina Bloomberg, equestrienne, daughter of Michael Bloomberg
 Doris Caesar, sculptor
 Eleanor A. Campbell, M.D., physician and founder, Judson Health Center
 Huguette M. Clark, artist and philanthropist
 Melissa Doi, businesswoman
 Lady Malcolm Douglas-Hamilton, philanthropist and anti-communist
 Elisabeth C. Draper, interior decorator
 Ruth Wales du Pont, socialite, philanthropist, and classical composer
 Dawn French, British comedian, star of French and Saunders and The Vicar of Dibley
 Helen Clay Frick, philanthropist and art collector
 Caroline Gorman, singer
 Francine du Plessix Gray, author and literary critic
 Janet Hobhouse, novelist and biographer
 Nancy Hopkins, molecular biologist
 Jade Jagger, jewelry designer
 Bonnie Jenkins, public service 
 Jill Kargman, actress, author, writer
 Jane Kim, politician
 Margaret Carnegie Miller, philanthropist
 Alley Mills, actress
 Elizabeth Montgomery, actress
 Alicia Munnell, Peter F. Drucker Professor of Management Sciences at Boston College
 Sara Wiborg Murphy, socialite
Dorothy Klenke Nash, neurosurgeon
 Gwyneth Paltrow, actress
 Mary Ellis Peltz, music critic, poet, and first chief editor of Opera News
 Karen Polle, equestrian
 Marjorie Post, philanthropist
 Sally Pressman, actress
 Louise Goff Reece, politician
 Evette Rios, lifestyle expert
 Emmanuelle Grey "Emmy" Rossum, actress 
 Natalie Mai Vitetti, socialite
 Kerry Washington, actress
 Electra Havemeyer Webb, arts patron
 Caroline Beaumont Zachry, psychologist

Affiliated organizations
 National Coalition of Girls' Schools
 New York State Association of Independent Schools
 New York Interschool

Spence in film and television

The main building of the Spence School (the Upper and Middle School) is on East 91st Street, one half block from 5th Avenue/Central Park, adjacent to the Cooper-Hewitt Museum (originally the Andrew Carnegie mansion), and across the street from the Consulate General of Russia.  The location (5th Avenue and 91st Street) has been used as a backdrop in several movies and television shows including

 The Anderson Tapes (1971, starring Sean Connery): This movie was directed by Sidney Lumet who later sent his eldest daughter (Amy Lumet) to Spence.  She graduated from Spence in 1982.
 Marathon Man (1974, starring Dustin Hoffman): the opening car chase ends in a ball of fire that was filmed directly in front of Spence.
 Arthur (1981, starring Liza Minnelli and Dudley Moore): The Cooper-Hewitt Museum played the role of Arthur's family mansion, and there is a good view of Spence in the background.
 Working Girl (1988, starring Melanie Griffith, Sigourney Weaver and Harrison Ford): Melanie Griffith and Harrison Ford crash a wedding filmed in the Cooper-Hewitt Museum, but Spence is clearly visible.
 A Perfect Murder (1998, starring Michael Douglas and (Spence alumna) Gwyneth Paltrow). Their residence is the building across the street, but Spence is visible in some shots. During filming Gwyneth visited Spence and a photo of her embracing her HS advisor was printed in the NY newspaper.
 Uptown Girls (2003, starring Brittany Murphy and Dakota Fanning): the exterior serves as Dakota Fanning's character's school.
 Gossip Girl (2008–2011): the exterior serves as a backdrop to many episodes of the television series, and, as the producers of the show have noted, many aspects of the Spence School have been highly influential in the creation of the show, including the green plaid jumpers and blue skirts, which are the official Spence uniform styles for the Lower and Middle schools, respectively.
 Riverdale (2017-): the main character Veronica Lodge recounts her past experiences at Spence throughout the show, though the school itself has not appeared.
 Hawkeye (2021): A Spence diploma is seen on Kate Bishop's bedroom wall in Episode 6 of the Marvel Cinematic Universe show.

See also

 Education in New York City

References

External links

 Official Spence School Web site

Educational institutions established in 1892
Girls' schools in New York City
Preparatory schools in New York City
Private K-12 schools in Manhattan
Upper East Side
1892 establishments in New York (state)